"I Miss My Homies" is the first single from American rapper Master P's 1997 studio album, Ghetto D, produced by Mo B. Dick & Odell of Beats By The Pound. The single was released a month prior to the album's unveiling. The song featured Silkk the Shocker, O'Dell, Sons of Funk, Mo B. Dick, and Pimp C. The song contains an element of sample of "Brandy" by The O'Jays from the 1978 album So Full of Love.

Charts and certifications

Weekly charts

Certifications

|}

References

1997 singles
1997 songs
Master P songs
Mystikal songs
Silkk the Shocker songs
Pimp C songs
Songs written by Pimp C